A population centre, in Canadian census data, is a populated place, or a cluster of interrelated populated places, which meets the demographic characteristics of an urban area, having a population of at least 1,000 people and a population density of no fewer than 400 persons per square km2.

The term was first introduced in the Canada 2011 Census; prior to that, Statistics Canada used the term urban area.

Northwest Territories 
In the 2021 Census of Population, Statistics Canada listed four population centres in the Northwest Territories.

Nunavut 
In the 2021 Census of Population, Statistics Canada listed six population centres in Nunavut. The former population centre of Kugluktuk was retired.

Yukon 
In the 2021 Census of Population, Statistics Canada listed two population centres in Yukon.

See also
List of the largest population centres in Canada
List of municipalities in Yukon
List of municipalities in the Northwest Territories
List of municipalities in Nunavut

References

Population centres
Population centres
Population centres